"Fever for the Flava" is a 2003 song by American rock band Hot Action Cop. It was listed at number six on "The 50 Worst Songs of the 2000s" by The Village Voice. Christopher Weingarten wrote that it was "a soft-R ode to screeching nonsense words that mean genitals." The line 'got the fever for the flava' was taken from a 1980 Pringles ad. The music video was directed by Marc Klasfeld.

Clean version
This song had most of its lyrics replaced by nonsensical babbling and slightly different verses so it could be featured on Need for Speed: Hot Pursuit 2, due to strong sexual content in the original version in order to keep the game's ESRB E rating in North America and its ELSPA 3+ rating in Europe.

Critical reception
Johnny Loftus of AllMusic described the song as "harmless, high-fiving fun," making note of its "ear-splitting guitars and muscular drum fills".

Track listings and formats
 Australian CD single
 "Fever for the Flava" (Radio Edit) – 3:40
 "Don't Remember"  – 3:48
 "Dirt Bike Rider"  – 3:37

 European CD single
 "Fever for the Flava" (Radio Edit) – 3:40
 "Don't Remember"  – 3:48
 "Dirt Bike Rider"  – 3:37
 "Fever for the Flava" (Video Enhancement) – 4:08
 "Bonus Footage" (Video Enhancement) – 2:00

Credits and personnel
 Rob Werthner – writer, guitar, vocals
 Tim Flaherty – guitar
 Luis Espaillat – bass
 Kory Knipp – drums
 Roach – keyboards
 Murray "Eh" Atkinson – guitar, keyboards
 Michael Baker – producer
 Robert "Void" Caprio – recording at Interzone Studios and Oceanway Studios (Nashville)
 George Marino – mastering at Sterling Sound (New York City)

Credits and personnel adapted from "Fever for the Flava" CD single liner notes.

Charts

Weekly charts

Year-end charts

Release history

References

2002 songs
2003 singles
Lava Records singles